Ferdinand Broili (11 April 1874 in Mühlbach – 30 April 1946 in Mühlbach) was a German paleontologist.

He studied natural sciences at the universities of Würzburg and Munich, where his influences were Karl von Zittel and August Rothpletz. In 1899 he received his doctorate from Munich with a dissertation on Eryops megacephalus, titled Ein Beitrag zur Kenntnis von Eryops megacephalus. In 1903 he obtained his habilitation, and in 1908 became an associate professor at the university. In 1919 he was appointed director of the Staatssammlung fur Palaontologie und historische Geologie ("State Collection for Paleontology and Historical Geology") in Munich.

In 1901 he traveled to the Texas Red Beds, where with Charles Hazelius Sternberg, he collected and studied fossil vertebrates of the Permian period. Later on in his career, he carried out significant investigations of pterosaur fossils from the Solnhofen limestone of Bavaria. In the 1930s, with Joachim Schröder, he published a 28 volume series on vertebrates of the Karoo Formation of South Africa (Beobachtungen an Wirbeltieren der Karroo Formation; 1934–37). The Permian amphibian genus Broiliellus commemorates his name.

Selected works 
 Permische stegocephalen und reptilien aus Texas, 1904 – Permian stegocephalians and reptiles of Texas.
 Grundzüge der Paläontologie (by Karl von Zittel, new edition by Broili, 1910–11).
 Zur Osteologie des Schädels von Placodus, 1912 – The osteology of the skull of Placodus. 
 Die permischen Brachiopoden von Timor, 1916 – The Permian brachiopods of Timor.
 Permische brachiopoden von Rotti, 1922 – The Permian brachiopods of Rote Island.
 Zur geologie des Vogelkop, 1924 – The geology of Vogelkop.
 Ein neuer Fund von Pleurosaurus aus dem Malm Frankens, 1926 – A new discovery of pleurosaurus from the Late Jurassic in Franconia.
 Mixosauridae von Timor, 1931 – Mixosauridae of Timor.
 Zur Osteologie des Kopfes von Cynognathus, 1934 – The osteology of the skull of Cynognathus.

References 

1874 births
1946 deaths
People from Bad Neustadt an der Saale
Ludwig Maximilian University of Munich alumni
Academic staff of the Ludwig Maximilian University of Munich
German paleontologists